The Masonic Temple-Hoquiam, in Hoquiam, Washington, is a three-storey Beaux-Arts Masonic building that was constructed in 1922.

It includes a two-storey ballroom.  It was designed by Sutton & Whitney, a Portland- and Tacoma-based partnership of Albert Sutton and Harrison A. Whitney.  Sutton was a 33rd Degree Mason.

An elevator tower was added in 1949.

It was listed on the National Register of Historic Places in 2007.

References

Clubhouses on the National Register of Historic Places in Washington (state)
National Register of Historic Places in Grays Harbor County, Washington
Beaux-Arts architecture in Washington (state)
Masonic buildings in Washington (state)
Masonic buildings completed in 1922
Buildings and structures in Grays Harbor County, Washington